Huguette Caland (Arabic: أوغيت الخوري; née El Khoury; 19 January 1931 – 23 September 2019) was a Lebanese painter, sculptor and fashion designer known for her erotic abstract paintings and body landscapes. Based out of Los Angeles, her art was displayed  in numerous exhibitions and museums around the world.

Early life
Caland was born into a Lebanese political family in Beirut, Lebanon on 19 January 1931. Her father, Bechara El Khoury, became the first post-independence president of Lebanon in 1943, serving the country for nine years.

Career
Caland came to art somewhat late in life, beginning her studies at the American University in Beirut in her 30s.

In 1970, she moved to Paris where she lived and worked as an artist for 17 years. She became a regular guest at the Feraud studio, meeting many artists, including André Masson, Pierre Schaeffer, and Adalberto Mecarelli. In 1979, Caland collaborated with designer Pierre Cardin, creating a line of caftans that were displayed at Espace Cardin. In 1983, Caland met Romanian sculptor George Apostu. From 1983 to 1986, they worked in Paris and in the Limousin, creating many paintings and sculptures during this time.

Caland moved back to Los Angeles in 1987, where she lived and worked. 

After moving from one studio to another, in 1997 she finally settled in a studio in Venice where she frequently hosted friends and members of the art community, including Ed Moses, Chris Burden, Larry Bell, Billy Al Bengston, and James Hayward.

In 2013 she returned to Beirut to say goodbye to her dying husband, and remained there until the end of her life.

Exhibitions

Solo exhibitions

 Huguette Caland, Galerie Janine Rubeiz, Beirut, 2011
 Huguette Caland Retrospective, Beirut Exhibition Center, 2013
Solo exhibition, Galerie Janine Rubeiz, Beirut, 2018
Tate St Ives, St Ives, UK, 2019
"Faces and Places," Mathaf: Arab Museum of Modern Art, Doha, August to December 2020
"Huguette Caland: Tête-à-Tête," The Drawing Center, New York City, June 11–September 19, 2021

Group exhibitions
 Art from Lebanon, Beirut Exhibition Center, 2012
 Institut du Monde Arabe, Paris, 2012
 Prospect 3 Biennale, New Orleans, 2014
 Frieze Masters, London, 2014
 Hammer Museum, Made in L.A., 2016
 57th Biennale de Venezia, 2017

References

External links
 Anne Mullin Burnham, 1994, Reflections in Women's Eyes, Saudi Aramco World
 Fayeq Owis, 2008, Huguette Caland, Encyclopedia of Arab American Artists
 Joanne Warfield, Byzantium in Venice: A Visit with Huguette Caland , The Scream
 "Huguette Caland: Her Magical World", Los Angeles Times, 19 June 2003, Her magical world
 Caland's page at the Levantine Cultural Center

1931 births
2019 deaths
Lebanese women painters
Lebanese women sculptors
Lebanese fashion designers
Lebanese women fashion designers
20th-century Lebanese women
Lebanese expatriates in the United States
Artists from Beirut
American University of Beirut alumni